Prabal Gurung  (born 1979) is a Singapore–born Nepalese–American fashion designer based in New York City.

Early life and education

Gurung was born on March 31, 1979, in Singapore to Nepali parents and raised in Kathmandu, Nepal. Family members as mentioned by Prabal in his social media and interviews include his mother, older brother and older sister. His mother, Durga Rana, was a former boutique owner. His older brother, Pravesh Rana Gurung, is an Indian film director, and his older sister, Kumudini Shrestha, is a teacher and social worker.

He went to a Jesuit school, St. Xavier's School in Jawalakhel. Before entering the fashion world, he earned a bachelor's degree in hotel management from the National Council of Hotel Management, Catering Technology and Applied Nutrition. He had always been interested in clothing and colors and was introduced to the world of fashion when he moved to one of the biggest cities in India, New Delhi. There, he attended the National Institute of Fashion Technology. 

He held apprenticeships at many local fashion and production houses and worked under Manish Arora, during which time he was able to grow as a designer. Gurung has stated, “From the brilliance of Bollywood to the fabrics, embroideries, and textures you can find at Chandni Chowk to the fast-paced streets of Mumbai, it’s an incredible place.” Eventually, he received an opportunity to assist stylists in London and Melbourne during fashion shows for international print media. This opened up more doors for Gurung to expand beyond Asia and make his mark around the world.

Career

In 1998 Gurung moved from New Delhi to New York City where he attended Parsons School of Design and studied under an internship with Donna Karan. Following an apprenticeship with Cynthia Rowley, he worked with Bill Blass for five years as a design director. His own collection PRABAL GURUNG was released during Fashion Week in February 2009 with the FLAG Art Collection. Some of his other achievements in fashion include designing for first lady Michelle Obama and the Duchess of Cambridge, Kate Middleton, being listed as a finalist for the Cooper-Hewitt National Design Award (2012), receiving the CFDA Swarovski Award for Womenswear (2011), winning the Drawing Award from the Creativity Center (2015), and working with Lane Bryant (2017), Target (2013), and MAC Cosmetics (2014).

Aside from his full-time career as a fashion designer, Gurung established the Shikshya Foundation in Nepal, a non-profit program to benefit underprivileged children in Nepal. This program was created in 2012, and since then has benefitted over sixty students. The Shikshya Foundation also funds workshops and orientations for teachers to provide students with a positive education in reading, writing, mathematics, and finance. To raise awareness for his project he worked with TOMS design company in 2016. In addition, Gurung has made strides in supporting Planned Parenthood, ACLU, voter registration, and created a relief fund for Nepal earthquake victims in 2015 which raised almost one million in funds. Gurung has joined many in a campaign called "Stop Asian Hate", which works to stop the rise in Asian hate-crimes and racism as exacerbated by COVID-19.

Awards and honors
In 2010 he was the recipient of the Ecco Domani Fashion Fund Award and received a nomination for the 2010 CFDA/Swarovski Womenswear Award. He was also chosen by prominent fashion editors, retailers, designers and business people for the CFDA Fashion Incubator for 2010–2012. In November 2010, Gurung was runner-up for the 2010 CFDA/Vogue Fashion Fund.

See also
 List of Nepali people
 List of LGBT people from New York City

References

External links
 Official website

Living people
American fashion designers
LGBT fashion designers
1974 births
People from Singapore
American Hindus
LGBT Hindus
Parsons School of Design alumni
National Institute of Fashion Technology alumni
Nepalese emigrants to the United States
American LGBT people of Asian descent
Nepalese fashion designers
Gurung people